Oddity is an upcoming role-playing video game. Its development was first announced in 2008 as Mother 4, an unofficial fan game in Nintendo's Mother series. Over the course of development, the game removed its ties to the series and rebranded as its own entity in early 2020. It has no set release date.

Gameplay 

The game takes place in Pleiades, a fictional country based on the United States, during the early 1970s, as a boy named Travis Fields leaves his town of Belring to join three other characters, Meryl, Floyd, and Leo, to uncover the mystery surrounding the "Modern Men". Its music and visuals are similar in style to the Mother series.

Development 

Near the end of its development, Mother series creator Shigesato Itoi announced that Mother 3 (2006) would be the last entry in the series. While fans of the series pressured Nintendo for a sequel, the company was not interested and in March 2008, fans announced that they would be developing their own entry as Mother 4. In a preview of the game, Kotaku described the fangame as visually stunning and true to the series, from its environment design to music, with a new nine-track soundtrack. The game was originally expected for release in late 2014, but was delayed several times. In 2015, the development team consisted of eight members working part-time, on a voluntary basis without compensation. Mother 4 was planned as a standalone game, with no emulator required, for Microsoft Windows, OS X, and Linux at no cost.

In 2017, the team announced that the title was no longer a fan game, and in 2020, they rebranded the game as Oddity with no formal relation to the Mother series. It has no set release date.

The development team has not provided any formal updates since December 2020.

References 

Upcoming video games
Fangames
Indie video games
Linux games
MacOS games
Mother (video game series)
Role-playing video games
Single-player video games
Vaporware video games
Video games set in the 1970s
Windows games